Senador Salgado Filho is a municipality of the western part of the state of Rio Grande do Sul, Brazil. The population is 2,770 (2020 est.) in an area of 147.21 km². It is located 492 km west of the state capital of Porto Alegre, northeast of Alegrete and east of Argentina.

Bounding municipalities

Santa Rosa
Giruá
Sete de Setembro
Guarani das Missões
Ubiretama

References

External links
http://www.citybrazil.com.br/rs/senadorsalgadofilho/ 

Municipalities in Rio Grande do Sul